O Emperor are a rock band from Waterford, Ireland.

History

Background

O Emperor are a five piece rock band from Waterford, Ireland. All members met in secondary school in Waterford and for these years went under a number of guises, performing covers in pubs and clubs throughout  Waterford city. The five went to college in Cork and during this period, evolved into an original outfit now called O Emperor in 2009.

Debut album: Hither Thither

Hither Thither was record after the individual members left college in 2009. The group located to a country house in Kinsale, Co. Cork and over the course of 9 months, self recorded and produced their debut album.
The record was released through Universal Records Ireland in October 2010 and went on to the nominated for a Choice Music Prize (Irish Album of the Year 2010)

Present

The group spent most of 2012 recording material for their second album Vitreous, which was released on June 14, 2013. Two tracks from this session Electric Tongues/Erman Gou were issued as a standalone double A-side single in November 2012.

Vitreous was self-recorded and produced in the band's very own studio (Big Skin HQ) in Cork city. Big Skin was (literally) built from the ground up and everything from label administration to recording happens inside its grubby, fire-stained walls. The resulting recordings are a direct representation of this operation, being the band's most potent and distinct work to date; a stamp moulded from their many meandering sessions there.

While debut Hither Thither could be described as a lush tapestry displaying a classical use of depth and shading, Vitreous presents the listener with a starker, polychrome and pixelated picture. Heavily distorted drums take their place alongside syrupy analogue synths and disgusting fuzz guitars sounding like bees buzzing inside tin cans. Beautiful landscapes are destroyed with disparate, abrasive sounds in perverse displays of artistic self-destruction.

In March 2015, the EP Lizard was released.

Discography

Studio albums

Extended plays

References

External links 
 Official Website
 Facebook
 Last FM

Irish alternative rock groups